Spinup Cycles (also called CSS, "on/off cycles" or "power cycles")  is a value that hard disk manufacturers give for the average times a hard drive can spin up before it fails.

Usually server hard disks are specified for less spinup cycles than desktop hard disks, because servers are only very rarely rebooted. On the other hand, server hard disks have much higher MTBF.

Hard disk drives